This is a list of state leaders in the 10th century (901–1000) AD, of the Holy Roman Empire.

Main

Holy Roman Empire in Germany

Holy Roman Empire, Kingdom of Germany (complete list, complete list) –
Louis the Child, King (899–911)
Conrad I, King (911–918)
Henry I, King (919–936)
Otto I, King (936–973), Holy Roman Emperor (962–973)
Otto II, King (961–983), Holy Roman Emperor (967–983)
Otto III, King (983–1002), Holy Roman Emperor (996–1002)

Austrian

Margraviate of Austria (complete list) –
Leopold I the Illustrious, Margrave (976–994)
Henry I the Strong, Margrave (994–1018)

County of Bregenz (complete list) –
Ulrich VI, Count (?–950/957)

Duchy of Carinthia (complete list) –
Henry I, Duke (976–978, 985–989)
Otto I, Duke (978–985, 1002–1004)
Henry II, Duke (989–995)
Henry III, Duke (995–1002)

Landgraviate of Sundgau –
Liutfrid, Count (876–902)
Liutfrid, Count (c.986)

March of Styria (complete list) –
Markward, Margrave (?–c.1000)
Adalbero of Eppenstein, Margrave (c.1000–1035)

Bavarian

Duchy of Bavaria (complete list) –
Luitpold, Margrave (895–907)
Arnulf, Duke (907–920, 920–937)
Eberhard, Duke (937–938)
Berthold, Duke (938–947)
Henry I, Duke (947–955)
Henry II the Quarrelsome, Duke (955–976, 985–995)
Otto I, Duke (976–982)
Henry III the Younger, Duke (983–985)
Henry IV, Duke (995–1004, 1009–1017)

Margraviate of the Nordgau (complete list) –
Luitpold, Margrave (895–903)
Poppo of Thuringia, Margrave (903–?)
Arnulf, Margrave (907–937)
Berthold of Schweinfurt, Margrave (?–976)
Henry of Schweinfurt, Margrave (994–1004)

March of Pannonia (complete list) –
Luitpold, Margrave (893–907)
Aribo of Austria (871–909)

Prince-Bishopric of Passau (complete list) –
Christian, Prince-Bishop (991–1013)

Bohemia

Great Moravia (complete list) – 
Mojmir II, Duke (894–906)

Duchy of Bohemia (complete list) –
Spytihněv I, Duke (c.894–915)
Vratislaus I, Duke (915–921)
Wenceslaus I, Duke (921–935)
Boleslaus I the Cruel, Duke (935–972)
Boleslaus II the Pious, Duke (972–999)
Boleslaus III the Redhead, Duke (999–1002, 1003)

Burgundian-Low Countries

County of Frisia / County of Holland (complete list) –
Dirk I, Count (896–931)
Dirk I bis, Count (931–939)
Dirk II, Count (939–988)
Arnulf, Count (988–993)
Dirk III, Count (993–1039)

County of Hainaut (complete list) –
Sigard, Count (898–908)
Reginar I, Count (870–898, 908–915)
Reginar II, Count (915–post-932)
Reginar III, Count (pre-940–958)
Godfrey I, Count (958–964)
Hainaut split into Mons and Valenciennes

County of Mons (complete list) –
Richar, Count (964–973)
Renaud, Count (973)
Reginar IV, Count (973–974, 998–1013)
Godfrey II, Count (974–998)

County of Namur (complete list) –
Robert I, Count (946–c.981)
Albert I, Count (c.981–1011)

County of Valenciennes (complete list) –
Amaury, Count (953–973)
Werner, Count (973)
Reginar IV, Count (973–974)
Arnulf, Count (974–988)
Baldwin IV, Count (988–1035)

Franconian

Duchy of Franconia (complete list) –
Conrad the Elder, ruler (?–906)
Conrad I the Younger, Duke (906–918)
Eberhard, Duke (918–939)

Lorraine

Lotharingia (complete list) –
Louis the Child, King (900–911)
Charles the Simple, King (911–923)

Duchy of Lorraine (complete list) –
Gebhard, Duke (903–910)
Reginar, Duke (910–915)
Gilbert, Duke (915–939)
Henry, Duke (939–940)
Otto, Duke (942–944)
Conrad, Duke (944–953)
Bruno the Great, Duke (954–965)

Duchy of Lower Lorraine (complete list) –
Godfrey I, Vice Duke (959–964)
Richar, Vice Duke (968–972)
Charles, Duke (976–991)
Otto, Duke (991–1012)

Duchy of Upper Lorraine (complete list) –
Frederick I, Duke (959–978)
Theodoric I, Duke (978–c.1027)

Rhenish

County of Bar (complete list) –
Frederick I, Count (959–978)
Theodoric I, Count (978–1026/1027)

Archbishopric of Cologne (complete list) –
Bruno I, Prince-Archbishop (953–965)
Volkmar, Prince-Archbishop (965–969)
Gero, Prince-Archbishop (969–976)
Warin, Prince-Archbishop (976–984)
Ebergar, Prince-Archbishop (984–999)
Heribert, Prince-Archbishop (999–1021)

Essen Abbey (complete list) –
Hadwig I, Princess-Abbess (910–951)
Agana, Princess-Abbess (951–965)
Ida, Princess-Abbess (966–971)
Mathilde II, Princess-Abbess (971–1011)

Prince-Bishopric of Liège (complete list) –
Notger, Prince-Bishop (972–1008)

Prince-Bishopric of Mainz (complete list) –
Hatto I, Prince-archbishop (891–913)
Herigar, Prince-archbishop (913–927)
Hildebert, Prince-archbishop (927–937)
Frederick, Prince-archbishop (937–954)
William, Prince-archbishop (954–968)
Hatto II, Prince-archbishop (968–970)
Rudbrecht, Prince-archbishop (970–975)
Willigis, Prince-archbishop (975–1011)

County Palatine of Lotharingia (complete list) –
Wigeric of Lotharingia, Count (c.915/16–922)
Godfrey, Count (c.940)
Hermann I of Lotharingia, Count (945–994)
Ezzo, Count (996–1034)

Prince-Bishopric of Sion (complete list) –
Hugues, Prince-Bishop (993/4–1018/20)

Prince-Bishopric of Speyer (complete list) –
Einhard, Prince-bishop (895/898–913)
Bernhard, Prince-bishop (914–922)
Amalrich, Prince-bishop (913/923–943)
Reginwalt I, also Reginhard, Prince-bishop (943/944–950)
Gottfried I, Prince-bishop (950–960)
Otgar, Prince-bishop (960–970)
Balderich, Prince-bishop (970–987)
Ruprecht, Prince-bishop (987–1004)

Prince-Bishopric of Strasbourg (complete list) –
Erkanbald, Prince-Bishop (982–991)
Wilderold, Prince-Bishop (991–999)
Alawich II, Prince-Bishop (999–1001)

Elector-Bishopric of Trier (complete list) –
Radbod, Prince-bishop (898–915)
Rudgar, Prince-bishop (915–930)
Rotbert, Prince-bishop (930–956)
Henry I, Prince-bishop (956–964)
Dietrich I, Prince-bishop (965–977)
Egbert, Prince-bishop (977–993)
Ludolf, Prince-bishop (994–1008)

Prince-Bishopric of Worms (complete list) –
Dietlach, Prince-bishop (890–914)
Richowo, Prince-bishop (914–950)
Hanno, Prince-bishop (950–978)
Hildebold, Prince-bishop (978–998)
Franco from Hesse, Prince-bishop (998–999)
Erfo, Prince-bishop (999)
Razo, Prince-bishop (999)
Burchard I, Prince-bishop (1000–1025)

Lower Saxon

Duchy of Saxony (complete list) –
Otto I the Illustrious, Duke (880–912)
Henry the Fowler, Duke (912–936)
Otto II the Great, Duke (936–961)
Hermann Billung, Ducal representative (961–973)
Bernard I, Duke (973–1011)

Billung March (complete list) –
Hermann Billung, Margrave (936–973)

Gandersheim Abbey (complete list) –
Liudgard I, Princess-Abbess (919–923)
Hrotsuit, Princess-Abbess (923–933)
Wendelgard, Princess-Abbess (933–949)
Gerberga II, Princess-Abbess (949–1001)

Obotrites (complete list) –
Nako, leader (954–966)
Mstivoj and Mstidrag, Prince (966–995)
Mieceslas III, Prince (919–999)
Mstislav, Prince (996–1018)

Upper Saxon

Eastern March (complete list) –
Odo I, Margrave (965–993)
Gero II, Margrave (993–1015)

Hevelli –
Baçlabič, Prince (921–936)

March of Merseburg (complete list) –
Siegfried, Count/Margrave (?–937)
Günther, Margrave (965–976, 979–982)

Margravate of Meissen (complete list) –
Wigbert, Margrave (965–970)
Thietmar, Margrave (976–979)
Rikdag, Margrave (979–985)
Eckard I, Margrave (985–1002)

Northern March (complete list) –
Dietrich, Margrave (965–983)
Lothair I, Margrave (983–1003)

Duchy of Thuringia (complete list) –
Conrad, Duke (892–906)
Burchard, Duke (907–908)
Eckard I, Duke (1000–1002)

March of Zeitz –
Wigger I, Margrave (965–981)

Swabia

Duchy of Swabia (complete list) –
Burchard I, Duke (909–911)
Erchanger, Duke (915–916)
Burchard II, Duke (917–926)
Herman I, Duke (926–949)
Liudolf, Duke (950–954)
Burchard III, Duke (954–973)
Otto I, Duke (973–982)
Conrad I, Duke (982–997)
Herman II, Duke (997–1003)

Duchy of Alsace (see also) –
Udo, Duke (fl.c.999)

Prince-Bishopric of Augsburg (complete list) –
Adalbero, Prince-bishop (887–909)
Hiltin, Prince-bishop (909–923)
Ulrich I, Prince-bishop (923–973)
Henry I, Prince-bishop (973–982)
Adalrich, Prince-bishop (982–988)
Luitold, Prince-bishop (989–996)
Gebehard, Prince-bishop (996–1000)

Italy

Holy Roman Empire in Italy

Kingdom of Italy (complete list) –
Integrum: Simultaneous claimants
Berengar I, King (887–924)
Louis III the Blind, King (900–905)
Rudolph II of Burgundy, King (922–926)
Hugh of Arles, King (924–947)
Lothair II, King (948–950)
Berengar II of Ivrea, co-King (950–961)
Adalbert of Ivrea, co-King (950–963)
Ottonian dynasty
Otto I, King (961–973)
Otto II, King (980–983)
Otto III, King (996–1002)

Upper Burgundy (complete list) –
Rudolph I, King (888–912)
Rudolph II, King (912–937)
Conrad I, King (937–993)
Rudolph III, King (993–1032)

Papal States (complete list) –
Benedict IV, Pope (900–903)
Leo V, Pope (903)
Sergius III, Pope (904–911)
Anastasius III, Pope (911–913)
Lando, Pope (913–914)
John X, Pope (914–928)
Leo VI, Pope (928)
Stephen VII, Pope (929–931)
John XI, Pope (931–935)
Leo VII, Pope (936–939)
Stephen VIII, Pope (939–942)
Marinus II, Pope (942–946)
Agapetus II, Pope (946–955)
John XII, Pope (955–963, 964)
Benedict V, Pope (964)
Leo VIII, Pope (964–965)
John XIII, Pope (965–972)
Benedict VI, Pope (973–974)
Benedict VII, Pope (974–983)
John XIV, Pope (983–984)
John XV, Pope (985–996)
Gregory V, Pope (996–999)
Sylvester II, Pope (999–1003)

Duchy of Spoleto (complete list) –
Transamund III, Duke (982–989)

Republic of Venice (complete list) – 
Pietro Tribuno, Doge (888–912)
Orso II Participazio, Doge (912–932)
Pietro II Candiano, Doge (932–939)
Pietro Participazio, Doge (939–942)
Pietro III Candiano, Doge (942–959)
Pietro IV Candiano, Doge (959–976)
Pietro I Orseolo, Doge (976–978)
Vitale Candiano, Doge (978–979)
Tribuno Memmo, Doge (979–991)
Pietro II Orseolo, Doge (991–1009)

March of Tuscany (complete list) – 
Adalbert II, Margrave (886–915)
Guy, Margrave (915–929) 
Lambert, Margrave (929–931)
Boso, Margrave (931–936)
Humbert, Margrave (936–961)
Hugh, Margrave (961–1001)

References 

10th century
 
-
10th century in the Holy Roman Empire
10th-century people of the Holy Roman Empire